Hyperprolinemia is a condition which occurs when the amino acid proline is not broken down properly by the enzymes proline oxidase or pyrroline-5-carboxylate dehydrogenase, causing a buildup of proline in the body.

Genetics

Mutations in the ALDH4A1 and PRODH genes cause hyperprolinemia.

Hyperprolinemia type I is caused by a mutation in the PRODH gene, which codes for the enzyme proline oxidase. This enzyme begins the process of degrading proline by starting the reaction that converts it to pyrroline-5-carboxylate.

Hyperprolinemia type II is caused by a mutation in the ALDH4A1 gene, for the enzyme 1-pyrroline-5-carboxylate dehydrogenase. This enzyme helps to break down the pyrroline-5-carboxylate produced in the previous reaction, converting it to the amino acid glutamate. The conversion between proline and glutamine, and the reverse reaction controlled by different enzymes, are important factors required to maintain proper metabolism and protein production.
A deficiency of either proline oxidase or pyrroline-5-carboxylate dehydrogenase results in a buildup of proline in the body. A deficiency of the latter enzyme leads to higher levels of proline and a buildup of the intermediate breakdown product pyrroline-5-carboxylate, causing the signs and symptoms of hyperprolinemia type II.Hyperprolinemia is inherited in an autosomal recessive pattern, which means two copies of the gene in each cell are altered. Most often, the parents of an individual with an autosomal recessive disorder are heterozygous carriers, having only one copy of the altered gene, without having signs and symptoms of the disorder. 

In about one-third of cases of hyperprolinemia, individuals carrying one copy of an altered PRODH gene have moderately elevated levels of proline in their blood, but these levels do not cause any health problems. Individuals with one altered ALDH4A1 gene have normal levels of proline in their blood.

Diagnosis

Types

Hyperprolinemia type I

It is difficult to determine the prevalence of hyperprolinemia type I, as many people with the condition are asymptomatic.
People with hyperprolinemia type I have proline levels in their blood between 3 and 10 times the normal level. Some individuals with type I exhibit seizures, intellectual disability, or other neurological problems.

Hyperprolinemia type II

Hyperprolinemia type II results in proline levels in the blood between 10 and 15 times higher than normal, and high levels of a related compound called pyrroline-5-carboxylate. This rare form of the disorder may appear benign at times, but often involves seizures, convulsions, and intellectual disability.

Hyperprolinemia can also occur with other conditions, such as malnutrition or liver disease. In particular, individuals with conditions that cause elevated levels of lactic acid in the blood, such as lactic acidemia, are likely to have elevated proline levels, because lactic acid inhibits the breakdown of proline.

Treatment
Dietary restriction of protein intake.

Research
A 2005 study on rats suggested that hyperprolininemia causes cognitive dysfunction.

See also
 List of amino acid metabolism disorders
 Inborn error of metabolism

References

Further reading
 Pyridoxal phosphate de-activation by pyrroline-5-carboxylic acid. Increased risk of vitamin B6 deficiency and seizures in hyperprolinemia type II

External links

Amino acid metabolism disorders
Autosomal recessive disorders
Disorders causing seizures
Rare diseases